Stephen Muzhingi (born 17 October 1980) is a Zimbabwean ultramarathon runner who won the Comrades Marathon on three consecutive occasions, he also won the Two Oceans Marathon.

Notable achievements

Personal bests
Marathon – 2:19:10 hrs (2011)
50 km road run – 2:49:56 hrs (2011)

References

1980 births
Living people
Zimbabwean male long-distance runners
Zimbabwean ultramarathon runners